Loryma egregialis is a species of snout moth. It is found in Spain, Portugal, France, Italy, Greece, North Macedonia, Bulgaria, Turkey and North Africa including Algeria.

Description
The wingspan is about 18 mm.

References

Pyralini
Moths described in 1838
Moths of Africa
Moths of Asia
Moths of Europe
Taxa named by Gottlieb August Wilhelm Herrich-Schäffer